Wayllakancha (Quechua waylla meadow, kancha enclosure, enclosed place, yard, a frame, or wall that encloses, Hispanicized spelling Huayllacancha) is a mountain in the Paryaqaqa mountain range in the Andes of Peru, about  high. It is situated in the Junín Region, Yauli Province, in the districts Suitucancha and Yauli. The peaks of Qarwachuku, Wallakancha and Ukhu Qhata lie north-west, north and north-east of Wayllakancha.

References

Mountains of Peru
Mountains of Junín Region